Louisiana grass may refer to:
Axonopus compressus
Axonopus fissifolius